Milton Vieira (born October 10, 1978) is a Brazilian mixed martial artist currently competing as a Featherweight. Vieira is widely credited as the inventor of the anaconda choke. Vieira is a Brazilian jiu-jitsu black belt under Murilo Bustamante and competed in several top grappling competitions including Grapplers Quest. Milton appeared at the 2007 ADCC World Championship and also the 2009 ADCC World Championship. In mixed martial arts, he has competed for the UFC, PRIDE, Strikeforce, DEEP, M-1 Global and Shooto.  He is stated to be the inventor of the anaconda choke from his days in Luta Livre.

Mixed martial arts career

Early career
Vieira made his professional mixed martial arts debut in June 2001 in his native Brazil. Over his decade-long career, he has competed in PRIDE Fighting Championship, DEEP,  M-1 Global and Shooto promotions.  During this time period he amassed a record of 13 wins, 7 losses and 1 draw, with all of his losses coming via decision.

Strikeforce
In mid-2011, Vieira signed a one fight deal with Strikeforce. He debuted against Sterling Ford at Strikeforce Challengers: Gurgel vs. Duarte on August 12, 2011 and won via technical submission (D'arce choke) in the first round.

Ultimate Fighting Championship
In early 2012, it was announced that Vieira had signed a four-fight deal with the UFC.

Vieira faced Felipe Arantes on June 23, 2012 at UFC 147. The two fought to a split draw.

For his second fight for the promotion, Vieira faced Godofredo Pepey on January 19, 2013 at UFC on FX: Belfort vs. Bisping. He lost the fight via split decision and was subsequently released from the promotion.

Mixed martial arts record

|-
| Loss
| align=center| 13–8–2
| Godofredo Pepey
| Decision (split)
| UFC on FX: Belfort vs. Bisping
| 
| align=center| 3
| align=center| 5:00
| São Paulo, Brazil
| 
|-
| Draw
| align=center| 13–7–2
| Felipe Arantes
| Draw (split)
| UFC 147
| 
| align=center| 3
| align=center| 5:00
| Belo Horizonte, Brazil
| 
|-
| Win
| align=center| 13–7–1
| Sterling Ford
| Technical Submission (D'arce choke)
| Strikeforce Challengers: Gurgel vs. Duarte
| 
| align=center| 1
| align=center| 4:49
| Las Vegas, Nevada, United States
| 
|-
| Win
| align=center| 12–7–1
| Bruno Lobato
| Submission (anaconda choke)
| Bitetti Combat MMA 9
| 
| align=center| 1
| align=center| 1:23
| Rio de Janeiro, Brazil
| 
|-
| Win
| align=center| 11–7–1
| David Cubas
| Submission (armbar)
| Bitetti Combat MMA 7
| 
| align=center| 2
| align=center| 4:12
| Rio de Janeiro, Brazil
| 
|-
| Loss
| align=center| 10–7–1
| Diego Braga
| Decision (unanimous)
| Platinum Fight Brazil 2
| 
| align=center| 3
| align=center| 5:00
| Rio de Janeiro, Brazil
| 
|-
| Win
| align=center| 10–6–1
| Luciano Azevedo
| Decision (split)
| Bitetti Combat MMA 4
| 
| align=center| 3
| align=center| 5:00
| Rio de Janeiro, Brazil
| 
|-
| Win
| align=center| 9–6–1
| Gustavo Rosa
| Submission (anaconda choke)
| The Warriors
| 
| align=center| 1
| align=center| 1:00
| Barra da Tijuca, Brazil
| 
|-
| Loss
| align=center| 8–6–1
| Luiz Azeredo
| Decision (unanimous)
| The One: VIP Fighting 
| 
| align=center| 3
| align=center| 5:00
| São Paulo, Brazil
| 
|-
| Win
| align=center| 8–5–1
| Jorge Britto
| Decision (unanimous)  	 
| Capital Fight
| 
| align=center| 3
| align=center| 5:00
| Brasília, Brazil
|
|-
| Win
| align=center| 7–5–1
| Yukinari Tamura
| Submission (rear-naked choke)
| Real Rhythm: 5th Stage
| 
| align=center| 2
| align=center| 2:34
| Osaka, Japan
| 
|-
| Loss
| align=center| 6–5–1
| Jean Silva
| Decision (split) 
| Super Challenge 1
| 
| align=center| 2
| align=center| 5:00
| São Paulo, Brazil
| 
|-
| Win
| align=center| 6–4–1
| Johnny Eduardo
| Submission (D'arce choke)
| Super Challenge 1
| 
| align=center| 2
| align=center| 0:59
| São Paulo, Brazil
| 
|-
| Draw
| align=center| 5–4–1
| Kazunori Yokota
| Draw
| Deep: 24 Impact
| 
| align=center| 2
| align=center| 5:00
| Tokyo, Japan
| 
|-
| Loss
| align=center| 5–4
| Nobuhiro Obiya 
| Decision (unanimous)
| Deep: 22 Impact
| 
| align=center| 2
| align=center| 5:00
| Tokyo, Japan
| 
|-
| Win
| align=center| 5–3
| Hiroki Nagaoka 
| Decision (unanimous)
| Deep: 21st Impact
| 
| align=center| 2
| align=center| 3:00
| Tokyo, Japan
| 
|-
| Loss
| align=center| 4–3
| Hayato Sakurai
| Decision (split)
| Pride: Bushido 7
| 
| align=center| 2
| align=center| 5:00
| Tokyo, Japan
| 
|-
| Win
| align=center| 4–2
| Diego Braga
| Submission (arm-triangle choke)
| AFC: Brazil 1
| 
| align=center| 2
| align=center| 4:25
| Rio de Janeiro, Brazil
| 
|-
| Win
| align=center| 3–2
| Jadyson Costa
| Submission (arm-triangle choke) 
| Meca World Vale Tudo 11
| 
| align=center| 3
| align=center| 1:08
| Teresópolis, Brazil
| 
|-
| Loss
| align=center| 2–2
| Jake Shields
| Decision (unanimous)
| Shooto
| 
| align=center| 3
| align=center| 5:00
| Hammond, Indiana, United States
| 
|-
| Win
| align=center| 2–1
| Magomed Dzhabrailov 
| Decision (unanimous)
| M-1 MFC – Russia vs. the World 5
| 
| align=center| 1
| align=center| 10:00
| Saint Petersburg, Russia
| 
|-
| Win
| align=center| 1–1
| Islam Karimov
| Submission (rear-naked choke) 
| M-1 MFC – Russia vs. the World 3
| 
| align=center| 1
| align=center| 8:08
| Saint Petersburg, Russia
| 
|-
| Loss
| align=center| 0–1
| Cyrillo Padilha Nelto
| Decision
| Heroes 2
| 
| align=center| 1
| align=center| 12:00
| Rio de Janeiro, Brazil
|

References

External links
Official UFC Profile 

Living people
1978 births
Brazilian male mixed martial artists
Lightweight mixed martial artists
Mixed martial artists utilizing Brazilian jiu-jitsu
Mixed martial artists utilizing catch wrestling
Mixed martial artists utilizing Luta Livre
Brazilian practitioners of Brazilian jiu-jitsu
People awarded a black belt in Brazilian jiu-jitsu
Brazilian jiu-jitsu trainers
People from Amazonas (Brazilian state)
People from Teresópolis
Pan American Games competitors for Brazil
Brazilian catch wrestlers
Ultimate Fighting Championship male fighters
Sportspeople from Rio de Janeiro (state)